Argyrohyrax is an extinct genus of interatheriid notoungulate that lived during the Late Oligocene, of what is now Argentina and Bolivia.

Description

This animal may have vaguely resembled a medium-sized ground-dwelling rodent, such as a marmot. Its skull was approximately 15 centimeters long, and its entire body may have reached one meter in length, including the tail. Argyrohyrax is differentiated from its closest relatives like Archaeophylus and Cochilius by small differences in its dentition, notably the overlap of the first premolar base by parts of the canine and the second premolar. Its maxilla had a very prominent descending process, as in Cochilius. The two first lower molars had a quadrangular trigonid and a subcircular talonid. The first lower premolar was canine-like.

Compared to some of its later relatives, Interatherium and Protypotherium, Argyrohyrax had a moderately expanded zygomatic arch ; its radius had a slightly concave distal articular surface, and the articulation between its ulna and its humerus was less concave and more vertical.

Classification

Argyrohyrax proavus was first described in 1897 by Florentino Ameghino ; he later described several other species, such as Argyrohyrax acuticostatus, A. concentricus, A. nesodontoides, A. proavunculus, currently considered identical to the type species. The genus Plagiarthrus is similarly considered synonymous with Argyrohyrax.
The genus Argyrohyrax is known from several fossilized remains discovered in Argentina, notably from the Sarmiento Formation in the provinces of Santa Cruz and Chubut, from the Agua de la Piedra Formation in Mendoza Province and from the Fray Bentos Formation in the Corrientes Province.

Argyrohyrax belonged to the family Interatheriidae, a group of medium-sized notoungulates, with a superficially rodent-like appearance. Several characteristics of its skull and dentition suggests that Argyrohyrax was nested as a basal member of the group.

References

F. Ameghino. 1897. Mammiféres crétacés de l’Argentine (Deuxième contribution à la connaissance de la fauna mammalogique de couches à Pyrotherium) [Cretaceous mammals of Argentina (second contribution to the knowledge of the mammalian fauna of the Pyrotherium Beds)]. Boletin Instituto Geografico Argentino 18(4–9):406-521
F. Ameghino. 1901. Notices préliminaires sur des ongulés nouveaux des terrains crétacés de Patagonie [Preliminary notes on new ungulates from the Cretaceous terrains of Patagonia]. Boletin de la Academia Nacional de Ciencias de Córdoba 16:349-429

Typotheres
Oligocene mammals of South America
Paleogene Argentina
Fossils of Argentina
Paleogene Bolivia
Fossils of Bolivia
Deseadan
Taxa named by Florentino Ameghino
Fossil taxa described in 1897
Prehistoric placental genera
Golfo San Jorge Basin
Paraná Basin
Sarmiento Formation